The General Directorate Of Highways (KGM) is a state agency in charge of the construction and maintenance of all public roadways outside of cities and towns in Turkey. It was established on 1 March 1950, following the acceptance of the International Highways Act in 1949. The agency is a sub unit of the Ministry of Transport and Communication. Current head of the agency is Abdulkadir Uraloğlu .

With its 18 divisions across the country, The KGM maintains a road network of  motorways  (Otoyol, prefixed by O),  State highways (Devlet yolu, prefixed by D) and  Province roads (İl yolu, prefixed by the two-digit province code) including related bridges, viaducts and tunnels on them, in total 68,633
km. 

The KGM administers the toll plazas on the toll roads and toll bridges collecting tolls, automated methods of transponder type OGS and RFID type HGS.

Divisions
 1st - Istanbul Province, Northern Marmara Region
 2nd - Izmir Province, Aegean Region
 3rd - Konya Province, Aksaray, Afyonkarahisar, Ardahan
 4th - Ankara Province, Kırıkkale, Eskişehir, Bolu, Düzce
 5th - Mersin Province, Adana, Kahramanmaraş, Hatay, Osmaniye, Kilis
 6th - Kayseri Province, Cappadocia, Yozgat, Kırşehir
 7th - Samsun Province, Middle Black Sea Region
 8th - Elazığ Province, Adıyaman, Bingöl, Malatya, Tunceli
 9th - Diyarbakır Province, Southeastern Anatolia Region
 10th - Trabzon Province, East Black Sea Region
 11th - Van Province, Muş, Bitlis, Southern Ağrı
 12th - Erzurum Province, Ağrı
 13th - Antalya Province, Burdur, Isparta, eastern part of Muğla and southern part of Afyonkarahisar
 14th - Bursa Province, Southern Marmara Region, Kütahya
 15th - Kastamonu Province, West Black Sea Region
 16th - Sivas Province, Erzincan
 17th - Motorways in Istanbul, including Bosphorus Bridges.
 18th - Kars Province with former districts Ardahan and Iğdır, former part of 12th

See also
 Transport organizations in Turkey
 General Directorate of Highways (Turkey) 
 Turkish State Railways
 TCDD Taşımacılık
 Turkish Airlines
 Transport in Turkey 
 Turkish State Highway System
 High-speed rail in Turkey
 Rail transport in Turkey
 Otoyol

References

1950 establishments in Turkey
Government agencies of Turkey
Government agencies established in 1950
Organizations based in Ankara
Roads in Turkey
Highways